Cat and Mouse may refer to:

Cat and mouse, an English-language idiom

Film
 Cat & Mouse (1958 film), a British crime drama film
 Cat and Mouse (1974 film), or Mousey, a Canadian thriller film
 Cat and Mouse (1975 film), or Le Chat et la souris, a French film by Claude Lelouch
 Cat and Mouse (2003 film), a Hong Kong wuxia film

Games 
 Cat and Mouse (card game), or Spite and Malice, a competitive patience game
 Cat and mouse (playground game)

Literature 
 Cat & Mouse (novel), a 1997 novel by James Patterson
 Cat and Mouse (novella), a 1961 novella by Günter Grass
 "Cat and Mouse" (Ralph Williams story), a 1959 novelette by Ralph Williams

Music
 The Cat and the Mouse, a 1921 piano composition by Aaron Copland
 Cat and Mouse (album), by By2, 2015
 "Cat and Mouse", a song by the Red Jumpsuit Apparatus from Don't You Fake It, 2006

Television episodes
 "Cat and Mouse" (Grimm), 2012
 "Cat and Mouse" (Star Wars: The Clone Wars), 2010
 "Cat and Mouse" (The Twilight Zone), 1989
 "Cat and Mouse", a c. 1952 episode of The Adventures of Ellery Queen

Other uses 
 Cat and Mouse (Sheep), a 1995 play by Gregory Motton
 Cat and Mouse Act, or the Prisoners (Temporary Discharge for Ill Health) Act, a 1913 British law

See also 
 Courageous Cat and Minute Mouse, a 1960–1962 American cartoon series
 Tom and Jerry, an American cartoon series and media franchise